Tin City LRRS Airport
  is a military airport located one nautical mile (1.85 km) east of the historic location of Tin City, in the Nome Census Area of the U.S. state of Alaska. It is owned by the U.S. Air Force.

Overview
Tin City Airport is a United States Air Force military airstrip. Its mission is to provide contractor access to the Tin City Long Range Radar Station for equipment servicing and other requirements.

The airstrip was constructed in 1951 during the construction of the Tin City Air Force Station. During the station's operational use as a manned radar station, it provided transportation for station personnel and for supplies and equipment to be airlifted to the station. With the manned radar station's closure in 1983, the airstrip now provides access to the unattended site for maintenance personnel and other requirements.

It is not staffed by any support personnel, and is not open to the public. During the winter months, it may be inaccessible due to the extreme weather conditions at the location. However, charter commercial air service is available for the military on Bering Air.

Facilities and aircraft 
Tin City LRRS Airport has one runway designated 16/34 with a gravel surface measuring 4,700 by 100 feet (1,433 x 30 m). For the 12-month period ending July 9, 1980, the airport had 350 aircraft operations: 57% air taxi, 29% general aviation and 14% military.

Airlines and destinations 
The following airlines offer scheduled passenger service at this airport:

References

Bibliography

External links
  AurNavLOAWD
 
 

1951 establishments in Alaska
Airports established in 1951
Airports in the Nome Census Area, Alaska
Military installations in Alaska